Soltannuxa (also, Soltan Nuxa and Soltannukha) is a village and municipality in the Qabala Rayon of Azerbaijan.  It has a population of 2,610.

References 

Populated places in Qabala District
Elizavetpol Governorate